Eucalyptus pyrocarpa, commonly known as the large-fruited blackbutt, is a species of medium-sized tree that is endemic to New South Wales. It has rough bark on the trunk and larger branches, smooth grey to white bark above, lance-shaped to curved adult leaves, flower buds in groups of between seven and eleven, white flowers and cup-shaped, barrel-shaped or pear-shaped fruit.

Description
Eucalyptus pyrocarpa is a tree that typically grows to a height of  but does not form a lignotuber. It has rough, short fibrous to stringy, greyish brown bark on the trunk and larger branches, smooth white to grey bark above that is often shed in ribbons. Young plants and coppice regrowth have stems that are more or less square in cross-section, glaucous, sessile and arranged in opposite pairs. Flowering has been recorded in March, February and August and the flowers are white.

Taxonomy and naming
In 1913, Joseph Maiden described Eucalyptus pilularis var. pyriformis from a specimen collected from Bucca Creek, near Coffs Harbour. The description was published in Journal and Proceedings of the Royal Society of New South Wales. In 1973, Lawrie Johnson and Donald Blaxell raised the variety to species status but the name Eucalyptus pyriformis was already used for a Western Australian species. Johnson and Blaxell gave it the name E. pyrocarpa.

Distribution and habitat
Large-fruited blackbutt grows in forest on sloping country in coastal and sub-coastal ranges between the Washpool National Park, Wauchope and Woodburn.

References

pyrocarpa
Myrtales of Australia
Flora of New South Wales
Trees of Australia
Plants described in 1973
Taxa named by Lawrence Alexander Sidney Johnson